Shahzad Khan Bangash is a Pakistani civil servant who served as Chief Secretary Khyber Pakhtunkhwa from November 2021 until January 2023.

Bangash was born in Behzadi Chakar Kot, Kohat District, He did his matriculation from Cadet College Kohat, FSc from Edwardes College Peshawar, and MBBS from Khyber Medical College, Peshawar.

See also
 Shahab Ali Shah

References

Living people
Pakistani civil servants
Chief Secretaries of Khyber Pakhtunkhwa
People from Kohat District
Edwardes College alumni
Khyber Medical College alumni
Cadet College Kohat alumni
Year of birth missing (living people)